Krzysztof Szwagrzyk (born 15 February 1964 in Strzegom) is a Polish historian, publicist and writer, since 1979 living and working in Wrocław, Poland. Szwagrzyk received his doctoral degree in 20th-century history from the University of Wrocław in 1996. He serves as president of the Public Information Bureau of the Institute of National Remembrance regional chapter in Wrocław, and is the author of numerous scientific papers and several monographs about contemporary Polish history, with special focus on the system of political repressions during the period of Stalinism in Poland, and the anti-communist structures in Lower Silesia in the years of 1945–1956. He's the author of screenplay Golgota Wrocławska.

Murders in the majesty of the law
In his monograph Zbrodnie w majestacie prawa 1944-1955 (Murders in the majesty of the law 1944-1955) Szwagrzyk focuses on the lesser known aspects of the entry into Poland by the advancing Soviet forces in 1944, resulting in the violent takeover of power by the communists. The presence of the vast number of officers and soldiers of the Red Army across Poland allowed for the creation of state apparatus the likes of which have never been seen before. A number of laws and regulations were introduced between 1944 and 1946 mirroring the Soviet model, which allowed for the arrest and persecution of military and civilian representatives of the Polish Underground State with indiscriminate use of death penalty. In the following decade over 5 thousand civilian Poles received death sentence from the army in the majesty of the law. In total, some 50,000 people perished in Poland during the communist takeover.

Works
 Krzysztof Szwagrzyk, Zbrodnie w majestacie prawa 1944-1955, Wydawn. ABC, Warszawa, 2000; 389 pages, .
 Krzysztof Szwagrzyk, Jaworzno: historia więzienia dla młodocianych więźniów politycznych 1951-1955,  Wydawn. "Klio", 1999; 431 pages. .
 Krzysztof Szwagrzyk, Winni? – niewinni? Dolnośląskie podziemie niepodległościowe (1945-1956) w świetle dokumentów sądowych, 1999; 430 pages. .
 Krzysztof Szwagrzyk, Prawnicy czasu bezprawia: sędziowie i prokuratorzy wojskowi w Polsce, 1944-1956,  "Societas Vistulana", 2005 - Instytut Pamięci Narodowej Komisja Ścigania Zbrodni przeciwko Narodowi Polskiemu - 2005 - 551 pages. .
 Krzysztof Szwagrzyk, Golgota Wrocławska: 1945-1956, - 1996 - Klio
 Krzysztof Szwagrzyk, Straceni na Dolnym Śląsku 1945-1956, Instytut Europejskich Studiów Społecznych, 2002; 193 pages. .
 Krzysztof Szwagrzyk with R. Czaplińska Z archiwum pamięci...: 3653 więzienne dni, - 2003
 Krzysztof Szwagrzyk, Historia przygotowań do amerykańskiego desantu pod Wrocławiem (1949-1952), - Pamięć i Sprawiedliwość, 2003
 Krzysztof Szwagrzyk, Listy do Bieruta: prośby o ułaskawienie z lat 1946-1956, - 1995 - Wydawn. "Klio"
 Krzysztof Szwagrzyk, Aparat bezpieczeństwa w Polsce: 1944-1956, Volume 1, Instytut Pamięci Narodowej, 2005; 603 pages. .
 Krzysztof Szwagrzyk, Skazani na karę śmierci przez Wojskowy Sąd Rejonowy we Wrocławiu, 1946-1955, - 2002 - Instytut Pamięci Narodowej
 Krzysztof Szwagrzyk, Sędzia-śmierć. Działalność sędziego Włodzimierza Ostapowicza na Białostocczyźnie (1946–1947), - Biuletyn Instytutu Pamięci Narodowej, 2005

References

External links
 Interview with Krzysztof Szwagrzyk 

20th-century Polish historians
Polish male non-fiction writers
Historians of Poland
Living people
1964 births
People associated with the Institute of National Remembrance
21st-century Polish historians